Events in the year 1934 in India.

Incumbents
 Emperor of India – George V
 Viceroy of India – The Earl of Willingdon

Events
 National income - 22,775 million
 15 January – The 8.0  Nepal–Bihar earthquake shakes the Himalayas with a maximum Mercalli intensity of XI (Extreme), leaving 6,000–10,700 dead.
 7 April – Mahatma Gandhi suspended his campaign of civil disobedience.
 July – The Communist Party of India is declared unlawful.
 September – Gandhi is successful in forcing the hand of the caste Hindus in favour of the depressed classes in the scheme of representation.
 G. Edward Lewis discovers 'man-like ape' fossils in Northern India. They are named Ramapithecus and Sugrivapithecus, after Rama and Sugriva.
 Unsuccessful attempts on the life of Sir John Anderson, Governor of Bengal.
 Protection was granted to the steel industry till 31 March 1941 subject to preference for English steel under the Ottawa agreement.
 Formation of Congress Socialist Party

Law
 54-hour week passed.
 Reserve Bank of India Act passed
 The graduates of Dehra Dun Academy could, by a new law, get the Governor-General's commission in the army and the Navy.
Sugarcane Act
Indian Aircraft Act
Petroleum Act
Dock Labourers Act

Births
7 January – Jamila Massey, actress and writer.
9 January – Mahendra Kapoor, playback singer (died 2008).
22 January 
 Vijay Anand, filmmaker, producer, screen writer, editor and actor (died 2004).
 Sugathakumari, poet and activist (died 2020)
2 February – Haripal Kaushik, field hockey player and commentator (died 2018)
15 March – Kanshi Ram, politician and founder of Bahujan Samaj Party (died 2006).
21 March – Buta Singh, politician, Minister of Home Affairs (1986–1989), Governor of Bihar (2004–2006) and Chairman of NCSC (died 2021)
24 April – Jayakanthan, writer, essayist, journalist, pamphleteer, film-maker and critic (died 2015).
16 May – Leela Nambudiripad, children's writer (died 2021)
19 May – Ruskin Bond, children's writer.
1 June – Mohan Kumar, Indian director (died 2017)
16 June – Kumari Kamala, dancer and actress
23 June – Virbhadra Singh, Chief Minister of Himachal Pradesh *18 November –
12 July – May Routh, Indian-born British-American costume designer (died 2022)
21 July – Chandu Borde, cricketer.
5 November – Rashid Byramji, horse trainer (died 2022)
18 November – C. N. Balakrishnan, Indian politician (died 2018)

Full date unknown
Manoj Das, writer. (died 2021)
Vijaya Mehta, theatre and film director and actress.
Kedarnath Singh, poet. (died 2018)

References

 
India
Years of the 20th century in India